The 2021 Open de Oeiras IV was a professional tennis tournament played on clay courts. It was the fourth edition of the tournament which was part of the 2021 ATP Challenger Tour. It took place in Oeiras, Portugal between 24 and 30 May 2021.

Singles main-draw entrants

Seeds

 1 Rankings are as of 17 May 2021.

Other entrants
The following players received wildcards into the singles main draw:
  Pedro Araújo
  Tiago Cação
  Luís Faria

The following player received entry into the singles main draw using a protected ranking:
  Viktor Galović

The following player received entry into the singles main draw as an alternate:
  Corentin Denolly

The following players received entry from the qualifying draw:
  Filip Cristian Jianu
  Nikolás Sánchez Izquierdo
  Timofey Skatov
  Denis Yevseyev

Champions

Singles

 Gastão Elias def.  Holger Rune 5–7, 6–4, 6–4.

Doubles

  Jesper de Jong /  Tim van Rijthoven def.  Julian Lenz /  Roberto Quiroz 6–1, 7–6(7–3).

References

2021 ATP Challenger Tour
2021 in Portuguese tennis
May 2021 sports events in Portugal